Gerardo Ignacio Navarrete Barrientos (born 14 July 1994) is a Chilean footballer who plays for Deportes Concepción in the Segunda División Profesional as a midfielder.

Club career
Born in Concepción, Navarrete joined C.D. Universidad de Concepción youth setup at a young age. He made his first-team debut on 22 November 2009, aged only 15, starting in a 1–2 home loss against Colo Colo. At the Concepción–based side he won the Primera B title (second tier) in 2013.

On 18 June 2014 Navarrete moved abroad and joined Spanish side Granada CF B, being immediately loaned to Cádiz CF for a year.

Honours

Club
Universidad de Concepción
Primera B: 2013

References

External links

1994 births
Living people
Sportspeople from Concepción, Chile
Chilean footballers
Association football midfielders
Universidad de Concepción footballers
Club Recreativo Granada players
Cádiz CF players
Hércules CF players
O'Higgins F.C. footballers
Coquimbo Unido footballers
Unión Española footballers
Deportes Concepción (Chile) footballers
Chilean Primera División players
Primera B de Chile players
Segunda División B players
Segunda División Profesional de Chile players
Chilean expatriate footballers
Chilean expatriate sportspeople in Spain
Expatriate footballers in Spain
21st-century Chilean people